Ahmed Masbahi (born 17 January 1966) is a Moroccan former footballer who played at international level, competing at the 1994 FIFA World Cup.

References

1966 births
Living people
Moroccan footballers
Morocco international footballers
1994 FIFA World Cup players
People from Meknes
Botola players
Kawkab Marrakech players
Association football defenders